Danter is a surname. Notable people with the surname include:

Robert Danter (1824 or 1825–1893), British trade unionist
Tom Danter (1922–1980), Welsh rugby union and rugby league player

See also
Dante (name)
Kanter